Ryan Harrison (born 13 October 1991) is a former professional footballer who played as a winger. His only professional appearance came for Bradford City in 2010.

Career
On 5 April 2010, Harrison made his professional debut in League Two as a substitute for Bradford City in a 2–1 loss to Macclesfield Town. In 2012, Harrison played for Swedish Division 3 side Ånge. He later played for Farsley and Ossett Albion. In August 2014, he suffered a serious knee injury while playing for Ossett Albion.

References

External links

Swedish football stats

Living people
1991 births
Bradford City A.F.C. players
Harrogate Railway Athletic F.C. players
English Football League players
English footballers
Ånge IF players
Ossett Town F.C. players
Farsley Celtic A.F.C. players
Association football wingers
English expatriate footballers
Expatriate footballers in Sweden
English expatriate sportspeople in Sweden
Division 3 (Swedish football) players